Pauls Creek is a  long 3rd order tributary to Stewarts Creek in Surry County, North Carolina.

Variant names
According to the Geographic Names Information System, it has also been known historically as:
Garners Creek
Little Pauls Creek

Course 
Pauls Creek rises at Fancy Gap, Virginia, in Carroll County and then flows south-southeast into Surry County, North Carolina to join Stewarts Creek about 1 mile west of Toast, North Carolina.

Watershed 
Pauls Creek drains  of area, receives about 50.4 in/year of precipitation, has a wetness index of 318.13, and is about 65% forested.

See also 
 List of Rivers of North Carolina
 List of Rivers of Virginia

References 

Rivers of Surry County, North Carolina
Rivers of Carroll County, Virginia
Rivers of North Carolina
Rivers of Virginia